Rundisdammen is a lake at Kongsøya in Kong Karls Land, Svalbard. It is located on Rundisflya, west of the glacier Rundisen, at the eastern part of the island. The name is taken from Rundisen, which has a circular shape.

References

Lakes of Svalbard
Kongsøya